Emayatzy Corinealdi (born January 14, 1980) is an American actress. She starred in the Ava DuVernay 2012 drama film Middle of Nowhere for which she won Gotham Independent Film Award for Breakthrough Performer and received Independent Spirit Award for Best Female Lead nomination. Corinealdi later starred in films Miles Ahead (2016), and The Invitation (2015). On television, she played the role of Belle in the 2016 remake of Roots. She also starred in Hand of God (2014-2017), Ballers (2017-2019), and The Red Line (2019). In 2022, Corinealdi began starring in the Hulu legal drama series, Reasonable Doubt.

Early life
Corinealdi was born January 14, 1980, in Fort Knox, Kentucky, the daughter of Rosemarie Hilton and Edward Corinealdi. Her father is Panamanian, while her mother is African-American from Ohio. As a member of a military family, she was raised between Germany and the U.S. states in Ohio, Kansas, and New Jersey. She studied in New Jersey at the Actor's Training Studio, then at the William Esper Studio in New York City, and then at Playhouse West.

Career
In her early career, Corinealdi co-starred in a number of independent and short films, had the recurring role on the CBS daytime soap opera, The Young and the Restless, and appeared in the Hallmark television film, The Nanny Express (2008). In 2012, she made her feature film debut as the lead in the drama, Middle of Nowhere. Corinealdi won the 14th Annual American Black Film Festival Star Project, an international acting competition for emerging multicultural artists. Later that year, she won the Gotham Independent Film Award for Breakthrough Actor for the film.  She was also nominated for an Independent Spirit Award for best female lead.

In 2013, Corinealdi appeared in the short film The Door, part of Miu Miu's fashion series Women's Tales, which reunited her with her Middle of Nowhere director Ava DuVernay. In 2014, Corinealdi was cast in the drama series Hand of God. Later that year, she won the role of Frances Taylor Davis, the wife of Miles Davis in the biographical film Miles Ahead. She also starred in the horror film The Invitation and the coming-of-age drama Beats.

In 2016, Corinealdi played the role of Kunta Kinte's wife, Belle, in A&E's Roots reboot. From 2017 to 2019, she had a recurring role in the HBO comedy-drama series, Ballers, and in 2019 starred in the Ava DuVernay-produced limited series The Red Line on CBS. In 2022, she was cast in her first series television leading role in the Hulu legal drama Reasonable Doubt produced by Kerry Washington.

Filmography

Film

Television

Awards and nominations

References

External links
 

21st-century American actresses
Actresses from Kentucky
Actresses from New Jersey
American film actresses
American people of Panamanian descent
American television actresses
Living people
African-American actresses
21st-century African-American women
21st-century African-American people
20th-century African-American people
20th-century African-American women
Year of birth missing (living people)